Catarata is a moth genus of the family Depressariidae.

Species
 Catarata lepisma Walsingham, 1912
 Catarata obnubila Busck, 1914
 Catarata stenota Walsingham, 1912

References

Stenomatinae
Moth genera
Taxa named by Thomas de Grey, 6th Baron Walsingham